The Sixth Kerala Legislative Assembly Council of Ministers, first E. K. Nayanar ministry, was a Kerala Council of Ministers (Kerala Cabinet), the executive wing of Kerala state government, led by Communist Party leader E. K. Nayanar from 25 January 1980 to 20 October 1981. It had 17 ministries. Many of its ministers were from Congress (A), a party split off from the Indian National Congress (Urs) by A K Antony, when the Congress (Urs) was accused of rampant corruption.

Ideological differences among the ruling partners arose, culminating in the withdrawal of support to the ministry by the Congress (S). When the eight-member Kerala Congress (M) also withdrew support to the Government, Nayanar tendered resignation and President's rule was imposed.

The Kerala Council of Ministers, during Nayanar's first term as Chief Minister of Kerala, consisted of:

Ministers

See also 
 List of Chief Ministers of Kerala
 List of Kerala ministers

Notes

Nayanar 01
1980 establishments in Kerala
1981 disestablishments in India
Cabinets established in 1980
Cabinets disestablished in 1981